The aetherie fritillary (Melitaea aetherie), is a butterfly in the family Nymphalidae.

Distribution 
It is found  locally in mountain areas of North Africa and very locally in southern Spain, southern Portugal, Sicily and southern Italy.

Biology 
The insect flies from mid-April until the end of May with a second generation in September in Italy. The habitat is open grasslands and flowery meadows. The larvae feed on various Centaurea knapweeds. The flowers of Centaurea also attract the nectar-feeding adults.

Description

External links
Euro Butterflies
Moths and Butterflies of Europe and North Africa
Melitaea aetherie (Aetherie Fritillary) - IUCN Red List

aetherie
Butterflies of Europe
Butterflies described in 1826